Conus aulicus, common name the princely cone,  is a species of a predatory sea snail, a marine gastropod mollusk in the family Conidae, the cone snails, cone shells or cones.

Description
The size of an adult shell varies between 65 mm and 163 mm. The shell is rather narrow and has an elevated spire. The color of the shell is chocolate-brown, covered by elevated close revolving lines of darker color. The surface is irregularly overlaid by subtriangular white spots, some of which are very large. The operculum is a very minute square on the dorsal surface of the hinder part of the foot.

The proboscis of Conus aulicus is varied with red and white.

Distribution 
This marine species occurs in the Indian Ocean off Chagos and  Mauritius; in the Indo-Pacific Region (excl. Hawaii).

References

 Michel, C. (1988). Marine molluscs of Mauritius. Editions de l'Ocean Indien. Stanley, Rose Hill. Mauritius
 Filmer R.M. (2001). A Catalogue of Nomenclature and Taxonomy in the Living Conidae 1758 - 1998. Backhuys Publishers, Leiden. 388pp.
 Tucker J.K. (2009). Recent cone species database. September 4, 2009 Edition
 Tucker J.K. & Tenorio M.J. (2009) Systematic classification of Recent and fossil conoidean gastropods. Hackenheim: Conchbooks. 296 pp.
 Puillandre N., Duda T.F., Meyer C., Olivera B.M. & Bouchet P. (2015). One, four or 100 genera? A new classification of the cone snails. Journal of Molluscan Studies. 81: 1-23

External links
 
 Conus Biodiversity Website: Conus aulicus
 Cone Shells - Knights of the Sea

aulicus
Gastropods described in 1758
Taxa named by Carl Linnaeus